Heat Generation is the second album and first studio album from The Radiators.

Overview

Four years after they had formed, and a year after the release of their first album, The Radiators entered the studio for the first time to create Heat Generation. The album failed to make much of a splash, and The Radiators gave up album-making for five years, until they were signed to Epic Records.

Track listing

Credits

 Camile Baudoin — Guitars and Vocals
 Dave Malone — Guitars and Vocals
 Frank Bua — Drums and percussion
 Reggie Scanlan — bass and cowbell
 Ed Volker — keyboards, Vocals and Percussion
 Bill Cat — producer
 The Radiators — Producer

References

The Radiators (American band) albums
1981 albums